Rubinoff is a surname. Notable people with the surname include:

 David Rubinoff (1897–1986), Russian-American violinist
 Ed Rubinoff (born 1935), American tennis player
 Jeffrey Rubinoff (1945–2017), Canadian sculptor